Matemanga is a village and ward in  the Ruvuma Region of southern-central Tanzania. It is located along the A19 road, to the northwest of Tabora.

References

External links
Maplandia

Wards of Ruvuma Region